Mulki is a panchayat town located at Mangalore taluk in Dakshina Kannada district in the Indian state of Karnataka.  It is on the banks of Shambhavi River. It was earlier known as Moolikapur, turned to Mulki. A small town with people of diverse religions, it is 10 km north of Suratkal.  Karnad is a locality within Mulki. Nearest railway station is Mulki railway station

Demographics
 India census, Mulki had a population of 16,398. Males constitute 48% of the population and females 52%. Mulki has an average literacy rate of 77%, higher than the national average of 59.5%: male literacy is 82%, and female literacy is 73%. In Mulki, 11% of the population is under 6 years of age.

The majority population of Mulki is Hindu, although there is a significant diversity in the form of Muslim and Christians. Hindus in Mulki are very diverse in themselves with a significant population of Billavas, Mogaveeras, Bunts, Goud Saraswats and Tulu Brahmins.

Economy
Skilled workers form small cottage industries and are entrepreneurial. Other major contribution to the local economy comes from agriculture and fishing.

Notable people
 Srinidhi Shetty
 Suniel Shetty
 Girish Karnad
 Mulki Sunder Ram Shetty
 Karnad Sadashiva Rao
 [[Budhi Kunderan
 Dhaniel Aranha Shenoy
 Ammembal Subba Rao Pai

Media 
The nearby cities of Mangalore and Udupi provide print publications and Internet sites that report news about Mulki. The most prominent local news sources are:

 Udayavani
 Karavali Ale
 Daijiworld
 Varthabharathi
 Prajavani
 The Times of India

References

External links
karnataka.gov.in 

Cities and towns in Dakshina Kannada district